Piercy Roberts was an English publisher, printmaker, and caricaturist active between 1785 and 1824. Most of his prints are caricatures, some after  his own designs and some after others such as  George Moutard Woodward.  He  collaborated with Thomas Rowlandson on several prints, most notably a pair of portraits of Josephine Beauharnais  (in the Royal Collection) and Napoleon (in the British Museum).

Life and work
Between 1801 and 1806, Roberts ran a print shop at 28 Middle Row Holborn  and published political caricatures, as well as social caricatures.  He depicts himself standing in the doorway of his print shop, with a crowd of onlookers examining his window in an  1801 print Caricature Shop, one of the best depictions of a print shop.   In  1801  he acquired bankrupt stock from James Aitken but eventually himself sold up to Thomas Tegg in 1806.  He made a series of anti-Napoleon prints between 1800 and 1815  and subsequently made a portrait engravings for several other publishers.

His name appears among the subscribers for The Comic works in Prose and Poetry of G.M.Woodward  a memorial collection for Woodward published by Thomas Tegg in 1808.

References

External links
 
 Piercy Roberts (British Museum)

British draughtsmen
English illustrators
English cartoonists
English caricaturists
English engravers
Artists from London
Year of birth missing
Year of death missing